William H. Cole IV (born November 21, 1972) is an American politician who represented the 11th District on the Baltimore City Council.  He was first elected to a four-year term beginning in December 2007 and served until his appointment by the mayor in August 2014 as CEO and President of the Baltimore Development Corporation.

Early life
William H. Cole IV was born on November 21, 1972, in Havre de Grace, Maryland. He attended Loyola High School. He graduated with a B.A. in government and politics from the University of Maryland, College Park in 1994. He graduated with a M.A. in legal and ethical studies from the University of Baltimore in 1996. Cole was a member of the Alpha Epsilon Lambda Honor Society.

Career and community service

Career history
 Delegate in the Maryland General Assembly, 4 years
 Special Assistant to Congressman Elijah E. Cummings, 6 years
 Elected Member, Democratic State Central Committee, 4 years
 Legislative Aide for former State Sen. Walter Baker, 2 years

Currently
 University of Baltimore
 Associate Vice President for Institutional Advancement (2003–present)
 Adjunct Professor, Legal & Ethical Studies graduate program (2005–present)
 Councilman, 11th District, Baltimore City Council (2007–present)

Councilman Bill Cole began his career in government as an intern in the Maryland State Senate in 1994, then served two sessions as  a legislative aide to former State Senator Walter Baker. In 1996, he was hired by newly elected Congressman Elijah E. Cummings (MD-07) as Staff Assistant and later Special Assistant.  Cole managed one of three district offices, remaining on the Congressman's staff until 2003.

In 1998, Cole was elected to the Democratic State Central Committee and a few months later selected to fill the District 47 Maryland House of Delegates seat vacated by Judge Timothy D. Murphy.  The 2002 legislative redistricting process eliminated Baltimore's 47th Legislative District and Cole lost to three incumbents in the newly formed 46th Legislative District.
He was first elected to the Baltimore City Council in 2007, and re-elected in 2011 winning 75% of the vote.

City Council committees
Cole was first elected to the Baltimore City Council in 2007, and re-elected in 2011, winning 75% of the vote. During his first term he served on a number of committees:

 Chair, Executive Nominations
     Chair, Housing & Community Development Subcommittee
     Member, Taxation, Finance, & Economic Development (Former Chair/Former Vice-chair)
     Member, Land Use & Transportation
     Member, Education
     Special committee on Property Tax Reduction
     Special Committee on New Homeowners Tax Credit
     Chair, Maritime Industrial Zoning Overlay (MIZOD) Review

Currently, Cole serves as:

 Chair, Recreation and Parks
     Chair, Executive Appointments
     Vice-chair, Housing & Community Development Subcommittee
     Member, Public Safety
     Member, Taxation, Finance, & Economic Development
     Member, Budget and Appropriations
     Member, Health

In August 2014, Cole was appointed President and CEO of the Baltimore Development Corporation (BDC) by Mayor Stephanie Rawlings-Blake.

Community service
Councilman Cole serves as a member of the board or volunteer with the following civic/service organizations:
 Director, Midtown Community Benefits District (2004–present)
 Director, Downtown Partnership & Downtown Management Authority (2007–present)
 Director, Visit Baltimore (2010–present)
 Director, Flag House & Star Spangled Banner Museum (2007–present)
 Board Member, Hoffberger Center for Professional Ethics at the University of Baltimore (2003–present)
 Board Member, Babe Ruth Birthplace & Museum and Sports Legends at Camden Yards (2009–present)
 Honorary Board Member, Fort McHenry Business Association (2010–present)
 Advisory Board Member: Downtown Baltimore Family Alliance (2008–present)
 Coach, South Baltimore Youth Soccer League (2006–present)
 Former President, Otterbein Community Association (2003–2006)
 Former Board Member, Patriots of Fort McHenry (2000–2004)

Personal life
Cole, his wife, Michelle and their three children (Caitlin, Chelsea, and Will) live in the Otterbein neighborhood where he served as president of the community association from 2003 to 2007. Their children attend Baltimore City Public Schools.

References and notes

External links
 Cole Website

1972 births
Living people
People from Havre de Grace, Maryland
University of Maryland, College Park alumni
University of Baltimore alumni
Baltimore City Council members